Eduard Hovy is a Research Professor in the Language Technologies Institute at Carnegie Mellon University. He is one of the original 17 Fellows of the Association for Computational Linguistics.

Biography
Eduard Hovy received M.S. (December 1982) and Ph.D. (May 1987) degrees in Computer Science from Yale University.  He was awarded honorary doctorates from the National University of Distance Education (UNED) in Madrid in 2013 and the University of Antwerp in 2015.

References

Living people
Computational linguistics researchers
Carnegie Mellon University faculty
Fellows of the Association for the Advancement of Artificial Intelligence
Fellows of the Association for Computational Linguistics
Year of birth missing (living people)
Natural language processing researchers
Presidents of the Association for Computational Linguistics